Mykhailo Hrushevsky Street is one of the most important streets located in Ivano-Frankivsk. It runs along several government institutions such as regional and city administration Bily Dim as well as the city's branch of the National Bank of Ukraine.

Description
The street has non-traditional form as it bends about ninety degrees. It starts at the western portion of the Mickiewicz Square and at first runs parallel to Nezalezhnist Street (stometrivka) then makes a wide turn northward towards the city's Railway Terminal. It ends at the intersection of Gryunwaldska Street, Harkusha Street, and Street of Vasylyanok. Its extension towards the Railway Terminal serves Gryunwaldska Street. The street has a both way single lane traffic from Vahylevych Street to Gryunwaldska Street. For the most of the part the street here has wider sidewalks. From the start to Vahylevych Street, Hrushevsky Street has a one way traffic in the eastern direction. The street here is narrower with a roadside parking allowed and small sidewalks on both sides.

Background overview

Until 1892 it carried the name of Ulica Zabolotowska after the village that once stood before the city was built here. In 1892 it was named Ulica trzeciego maja (Street of the 3rd May) after the Polish Constitution adopted on May 3, 1791. Around 1919 it also carried name of Ivan Franko (today - another street). During the Soviet times the street was renamed into Karl Marks Street until 1991. After the establishment of the Ukrainian independence on September 29, 1991 it was renamed into Hrushevsky Street at the 125th birthday anniversary of Mykhailo Hrushevsky. Since then every year on September 29 various festivities take place near the administration building Bily Dim.

On this street was born a well-known Austrian opera singer Ira Malaniuk (1923–2009). In 1993 here in the Bily Dim took place the 1st Hutsul Congress. Along the street also is located cinema theater "Lumier", few buildings of the Medical University, the Ukrainian Scientific-Research Institute of Mountain Forestry, building of a former school among the teachers of which was a Ukrainian writer Dmytro Makohon, father of Iryna Vilde.

Addresses
 Number 3 Cinema theater "Lumier"
 Number 16 city's General Education School #7
 Number 18 "Prosvita" Building
 Number 18A Building of the city's Russian community
 Number 21 State Administration Building (Bily Dim)
 Number 31 Institute of Forestry
 Number 34A National Bank branch

Places of interest
 Cinema theater "Lumier"
 Monument to unification of the Western Ukraine with the rest of Ukraine
 Park "Valy"
 Mickiewicz Park
 "Bily Dim"

References

External links
  Virtual tour around the city of Ivano-Frankivsk
  Hrushevsky Street on a map near the Bily Dim
 Jewish prayer house at Hrushevsky Street (photo)
 Movie theater "Lumier" at Hrushevsky Street (photo)

Streets in Ivano-Frankivsk